In algebraic geometry, the Gabriel–Rosenberg reconstruction theorem, introduced in , states that a quasi-separated scheme can be recovered from the category of quasi-coherent sheaves on it. The theorem is taken as a starting point for noncommutative algebraic geometry as the theorem says (in a sense) working with stuff on a space is equivalent to working with the space itself. It is named after Pierre Gabriel and Alexander L. Rosenberg.

See also 
Tannakian duality

References

External links 
https://ncatlab.org/nlab/show/Gabriel-Rosenberg+theorem
How to unify various reconstruction theorems (Gabriel-Rosenberg, Tannaka,Balmers)

Theorems in algebraic geometry
Scheme theory
Sheaf theory